Kate Small is an American writer. Her work has appeared in The Boston Review, Nimrod, The Madison Review and elsewhere.

Stories by Small have been reprinted in Best New American Voices and New Stories From the South.

She earned her MFA in creative writing from San Francisco State University and lives in Friday Harbor, Washington, where she teaches humanities at the Spring Street International School.

Books 
The Gap in the Letter C: Stories (Fourteen Hills Press, 1999)

Notes

External links 
 More about Kate Small

American women short story writers
American short story writers
Living people
San Francisco State University alumni
Writers from Portland, Oregon
Year of birth missing (living people)
21st-century American women